George Keith Batchelor FRS (8 March 1920 – 30 March 2000) was an Australian applied mathematician and fluid dynamicist.

He was for many years a Professor of Applied Mathematics in the University of Cambridge, and was founding head of the Department of Applied Mathematics and Theoretical Physics (DAMTP). In 1956 he founded the influential Journal of Fluid Mechanics which he edited for some forty years. Prior to Cambridge he studied at Melbourne High School and University of Melbourne.

As an applied mathematician (and for some years at Cambridge a co-worker with Sir Geoffrey Taylor in the field of turbulent flow), he was a keen advocate of the need for physical understanding and sound experimental basis.

His An Introduction to Fluid Dynamics (CUP, 1967) is still considered a classic of the subject, and has been re-issued in the Cambridge Mathematical Library series, following strong current demand. Unusual for an 'elementary' textbook of that era, it presented a treatment in which the properties of a real viscous fluid were fully emphasised. He was elected a Foreign Honorary Member of the American Academy of Arts and Sciences in 1959.

The Batchelor Prize award, is named in his honour and is awarded every four years at the meeting of the International Congress on Theoretical and Applied Mechanics.

References

External links
 
 An Introduction to Fluid Dynamics by G. K. Batchelor at Cambridge Mathematical Library.
 Obituaries for George Batchelor (with portraits)  at the Department of Applied Mathematics and Theoretical Physics (DAMTP) of the University of Cambridge website
 Obituary  by Julian Hunt
 Video recording of the K. Moffatt's lecture on life and work of George Batchelor

1920 births
2000 deaths
Academics of the University of Cambridge
Alumni of the University of Cambridge
20th-century Australian mathematicians
Fellows of the American Academy of Arts and Sciences
Fellows of the Royal Society
Foreign associates of the National Academy of Sciences
Fluid dynamicists
Cambridge mathematicians
People educated at Melbourne High School
Royal Medal winners
Australian textbook writers
Mathematicians from Melbourne
Journal of Fluid Mechanics editors